Spaulding was used as an automobile marque by two separate companies. The Spaulding Automobile and Motor Company of Buffalo, New York built Veteran Era automobiles in 1902 and 1903.  Spaulding Manufacturing Company of Grinnell, Iowa built Brass Era automobiles from 1910 to 1916.

Spaulding (1902-1903)

The Spaulding Automobile and Motor Company of Buffalo, New York was incorporated in January 1902 by Henry F. Spaulding and his brother C. M. Spaulding.  Start-up of Spaulding production was delayed by a lawsuit brought by the Olds Motor Works regarding infringement of its motor patents. Henry Spaulding redesigned his single-cylinder engine and manufactured a run of 100 Spaulding runabouts. The spring suspension of the Spaulding was very much like the curved-dash Oldsmobile as well, and Olds sued again.

The 6-hp single-cylinder runabout sold for $650 in 1902, increased to $700 in 1903. The runabout steered by tiller and featured a planetary transmission. Spaulding introduced a larger two-cylinder tonneau touring car in January 1903.  The touring car had wheel steering and a three-speed sliding gear transmission. The vertical 25-hp two-cylinder engine was located under the hood. Spaulding  displayed at the Chicago and New York Automobile Shows. Spaulding planned to price the Touring car at $1,200, . 

By February of 1903 the company was in financial trouble and in March was sold at a receiver's sale to J. F. Morlock who built the Spaulding runabout as a Morlock until October 1903.  In August 1903, Henry F. Spaulding was testing a new experimental car on the tow path of the Erie Canal where he unfortunately drove the car into the canal and was drowned.

Spaulding (1910-1916)

Henry W. Spaulding arrived in Iowa in 1876 where he set up shop as a blacksmith and carriage manufacturer in Grinnell.  At the turn of the century the Spaulding Manufacturing Company was the oldest and largest producer of vehicles west of the Mississippi.

Henry Spaulding's sons, Frederick E. and Ernest H. joined their father in the family business. The Spaulding automobiles introduced in 1910 were a 30-hp Model C with three-speed sliding gear transmission and Model D with a two-speed planetary transmission.  Rutenber was the primary engine supplier.  The wheelbase was 112 inches, and the price $1,500, .  These cars were sold through the Spaulding carriage agents.

In 1911 the Model D became a larger 122-inch wheelbase, $2,500 40-hp car, which the Spauldings attempted ,as Model G, to market through established automobile dealers. This did not work well and in 1912 Spaulding returned to using its carriage outlets almost exclusively.

In 1913 the Spaulding was revised as Model G with a 40 hp Buda four-cylinder engine on a 120- inch wheelbase. Electric lighting was later joined with electric starting.  Called the Spaulding 40, and priced in the $1,800 range, it remained in this configuration until the end of automobile production.

In 1914 in traveling the River-to-River (Mississippi-to-Missouri) Road in what was claimed "a world's dirt-road speed record", Spaulding established a new cross-state speed record.  The Panama-Pacific International Exposition selected a Spaulding the following year to map the overland route to the California exposition. The car traveled with a moving picture camera to film during its journey.

In 1915  Spaulding offered a model called the Sleeping Car (predating Nash by 20 years), which provided overnight accommodations.  Difficulty in getting parts transported to Grinnell and under-financing caused the end for the Spaulding car in 1916.  Spaulding Manufacturing had begun building truck bodies and this replaced car manufacturing.  In the early Twenties the Spaulding Manufacturing Company was producing road machinery.  The business closed in 1929.  Henry W. Spaulding died in 1937 at the age of ninety-one.

See also
 Spaulding Manufacturing Company

External links
Spaulding Manufacturing Co. at Coachbuilt.com
IHDC Spaulding Image Collection
Iowas Automobiles by Bill Jepsen review at Undiscovered Classics

Reference 

Defunct motor vehicle manufacturers of the United States
Motor vehicle manufacturers based in New York (state)
Motor vehicle manufacturers based in Iowa
1900s cars
1910s cars
Veteran vehicles
Brass Era vehicles
Coachbuilders of the United States
Vehicle manufacturing companies established in 1902
Vehicle manufacturing companies disestablished in 1903
Vehicle manufacturing companies established in 1910
Vehicle manufacturing companies disestablished in 1916
Cars introduced in 1902
Cars introduced in 1910